Zamalek Club Championships list displays all Zamalek SC trophies and achievements in football since its inception on January 5, 1911, under the name of Qasr El Nil Club at the hands of the Belgian George Merzbach. Zamalek is a professional Egyptian sports club that plays in the Egyptian League, and it is one of seven clubs that have not been relegated to the second division. Zamalek is one of the most successful clubs in the history of Egyptian football in terms of the number of local championships, as it has won fourteen league titles, twenty-eight titles in the Egypt Cup, four titles in the Super Cup,  thirteen  titles in the Cairo District League and two titles in the Sultan Hussein Cup. It is also one of the most successful clubs in the history of African football at the level of African championships, as it has achieved thirteen African continental titles by winning the African Champions League five times, four times in the African Super Cup, once in the African Confederation Cup, and once in the African Cup Winners' Cup, in addition to winning Twice Afro-Asian Cup. At the Arab level, he won the Arab Club Champions Cup once and the Egyptian Saudi Super Cup twice. The Zamalek football team is the most victorious African Champions League in the twentieth century, and the most continental championship win in the twentieth century, with 9 tournaments. The football team in Zamalek also won the title of the best club in the world according to the International Federation of Football History and Statistics (IFFHS) in February 2003.

The list includes all the achievements of the Zamalek club throughout its history and with the various names of the club from the mixed club (1913-1941) to Farouk I Club (1941-1952), where it was known before the July 23 revolution, and even its current name, which was changed to it after the revolution.

Surnames under the name:

Mixed club (1913–1941)
Farouk Club (1941–1952)
Zamalek club (1952–present).

Summary

Domestic trophies

Continental and intercontinental trophies

Arab Area

Other trophies
 
 
  shared record

References

External links 
Official website
Zamalek TV channel on YouTube
Zamalek SC on FIFA.com
Zamalek SC on CAF
Zamalek SC on Egyptian Football Association

Honours